Patrick Cantlay (born March 17, 1992) is an American professional golfer. He had a successful amateur career and was the number one golfer in the World Amateur Golf Ranking for 55 weeks. He has won eight times on the PGA Tour as well as the 2021 FedEx Cup.

He is a member of the 2022 class of the UCLA Athletics Hall of Fame.

Early life and amateur career
Cantlay was born in Long Beach, California to Steve and Colleen (Naylan) Cantlay, He has a sister, Caroline, and two brothers, Nick and Jack Cantlay. He attended Servite High School where he won the California State High School Championship as a senior.

In his freshman year at UCLA, Cantlay won four tournaments and won the Haskins Award as the most outstanding college golfer in 2011. He was also named the Golf Coaches Association of America (GCAA) Division I Jack Nicklaus National Player of the Year. Cantlay also won the Phil Mickelson Award as the GCAA National Freshman of the Year in addition to being the Pac-10 Player of the Year and Freshman of the Year. He also won the Mark H. McCormack Medal as the top-ranked amateur in the world at the end of the 2011 season. This award earned him an invitation to the 2012 Open Championship.

Cantlay qualified for the 2011 U.S. Open through sectional qualifying. He was one of three amateurs to make the cut along with Russell Henley and Brad Benjamin. Rounds of 70 and 72 over the weekend ensured he was low amateur. His back nine 30 was the best in the tournament and he finished in a tie for 21st. The following week, on June 24, Cantlay shot the lowest round in PGA Tour history by an amateur when he shot a course record 60 at the Travelers Championship at TPC River Highlands in Cromwell, Connecticut. The following week, he finished as the low amateur at the AT&T National, finishing in a tie for 20th place. The following week, Cantlay won the Southern California Amateur at the San Gabriel Country Club. He was also low amateur at the 2011 RBC Canadian Open in July, finishing in a tie for ninth place.

On August 6, Cantlay lost to Ethan Tracy in the Western Amateur final at the North Shore Country Club in Glenview, Illinois. On August 28, at Erin Hills in Erin, Wisconsin, he lost in the final of the U.S. Amateur to Kelly Kraft. Making the finals earned him a spot in the 2012 Masters Tournament, where he finished in a tie for 47th, making him the low amateur.

On March 23, 2011 he became world number 1 in the World Amateur Golf Ranking. He holds the records for most consecutive weeks at number one, 54, and held the record for most total weeks at number one, 55, until Jon Rahm eclipsed him in 2016.

Cantlay represented the United States at the 2011 Walker Cup, where he posted a 2–1–1 record.

Professional career
In June 2012, Cantlay decided to forgo his final two years of college to turn professional. The decision to go professional meant forfeiting his spot at the 2012 Open Championship. His professional debut was at the 2012 Travelers Championship, where he missed the cut. Prior to the Travelers, Cantlay announced he would be signing with Mark Steinberg and Excel Sports Management Group, the same management as Tiger Woods. Cantlay was the number one amateur in the world before turning pro, holding the top spot for a record 55 weeks. At the time, he was also ranked 415th in the Official World Golf Ranking. He earned his first professional paycheck at AT&T National, finishing in a tie for 66th. The following week he finished in a tie for 38th at the Greenbrier Classic.

Cantlay earned his first professional win at the 2013 Colombia Championship, an event on the Web.com Tour. He played in the Web.com Tour Finals and finished 11th to earn his PGA Tour card for 2014.  In the 2013–14 season he played only five events due to a back injury and was granted an 11-event medical extension. He played in just one tournament the following season, in late 2014, but didn't play at all in 2015 or 2016. As of the start of the 2017 season, ten starts remained on his medical extension.

In February 2016, his caddie, Chris Roth, was killed in a hit-and-run accident in Newport Beach, California while Roth and Cantlay were out on the town. Roth had been a high school teammate of Cantlay's and had caddied for him in his amateur and professional career.

In his second start of the 2017 season, Cantlay regained his PGA Tour card with a runner-up finish at the Valspar Championship. He finished third at the Heritage, 10th at the Northern Trust, 13th at the Dell Technologies Championship and 9th at the BMW Championship, which allowed him to qualify to the Tour Championship.

In his second start of the 2018 season, on November 5, 2017, Cantlay won his first PGA Tour title at the Shriners Hospitals for Children Open on the second extra hole of a three-man playoff.  It was the second consecutive year in which his second start of the season secured his Tour card for the following season.

On November 4, 2018, Cantlay narrowly missed defending his title at the Shriners Hospitals for Children Open. He finished second by one stroke to champion Bryson DeChambeau. 

In 2019, he finished tied for third place at the PGA Championship behind winner, Brooks Koepka. Two weeks later he won the Memorial Tournament in Dublin, Ohio, a result that lifted him into the world top-10 for the first time. Cantlay shot a final round of 64 to come from four strokes behind the 54-hole leader Martin Kaymer and win his second PGA Tour title.

In October 2019, Cantlay again narrowly missed winning the Shriners Hospitals for Children Open. He lost a playoff to Kevin Na on the second playoff hole. In December, Cantlay played on the U.S. team at the 2019 Presidents Cup at Royal Melbourne Golf Club in Australia. The U.S. team won 16–14. Cantlay went 3–2–0 and won his Sunday singles match against Joaquín Niemann.

In October 2020, Cantlay won the Zozo Championship at Sherwood Country Club in Thousand Oaks, California. The event normally takes place in Japan but was moved to California in 2020 due to the COVID-19 pandemic.

At The American Express in January 2021, Cantlay made the halfway cut on the number; and then fired twenty birdies over the weekend, including in a 11-under-par final round 61 to post a 22-under total and the clubhouse lead. He was eventually edged out by a single stroke by Kim Si-woo. In June, Cantlay won the Memorial Tournament for a second time. He beat Collin Morikawa in a playoff. On August 29, 2021, Cantlay won the BMW Championship on the sixth hole of a sudden-death playoff over Bryson DeChambeau. The following week, Cantlay, on September 5, 2021, won the Tour Championship at East Lake Golf Club in Atlanta, Georgia. This victory won him the FedEx Cup and a $15,000,000 season long bonus. He was voted the PGA Tour Player of the Year.

In September 2021, Cantlay played on the U.S. team in the 2021 Ryder Cup; he won three and tied one of the four matches he played.

In August 2022, Cantlay successfully defended his title at the BMW Championship.

Cantlay qualified for the U.S. team at the 2022 Presidents Cup; he won three and lost one of the four matches he played.

Professional wins (9)

PGA Tour wins (8)

1Started tournament at −10 FedEx Cup playoffs adjustment, scored −11 to par.

PGA Tour playoff record (3–3)

Web.com Tour wins (1)

Web.com Tour playoff record (0–1)

Results in major championships
Results not in chronological order in 2020.

LA = Low amateur
CUT = missed the half-way cut
"T" = tied for place
NT = No tournament due to COVID-19 pandemic

Summary

Most consecutive cuts made – 10 (2018 U.S. Open – 2020 Masters)
Longest streak of top-10s – 2 (2019 Masters – 2019 PGA)

Results in The Players Championship

CUT = missed the halfway cut
"T" indicates a tie for a place
C = Canceled after the first round due to the COVID-19 pandemic

Results in World Golf Championships

1Cancelled due to COVID-19 pandemic

NT = No tournament
"T" = Tied
Note that the Championship and Invitational were discontinued from 2022.

PGA Tour career summary

Cantlay was an amateur.

* As of September 8, 2021

U.S. national team appearances
Amateur
Palmer Cup: 2011 (winners)
Walker Cup: 2011

Professional
Presidents Cup: 2019 (winners), 2022 (winners)
Ryder Cup: 2021 (winners)

See also
2013 Web.com Tour Finals graduates

References

External links

Profile on UCLA's official athletic site

American male golfers
UCLA Bruins men's golfers
PGA Tour golfers
Korn Ferry Tour graduates
Golfers from California
Servite High School alumni
Sportspeople from Long Beach, California
1992 births
Living people